Han Hyung-bae (born March 21, 1976) is a field hockey player from South Korea, who was a member of the Men's National Team that won the silver medal at the 2000 Summer Olympics in Sydney. In the final the Asians were beaten by the title holders Netherlands after penalty strokes.

References 
 Profile on Athens 2004 Web Site

External links

1976 births
Living people
South Korean male field hockey players
Olympic field hockey players of South Korea
1998 Men's Hockey World Cup players
Field hockey players at the 2000 Summer Olympics
2002 Men's Hockey World Cup players
Field hockey players at the 2004 Summer Olympics
Olympic silver medalists for South Korea
Olympic medalists in field hockey
Medalists at the 2000 Summer Olympics